Legislative elections were held in South Korea on 30 May 1950. The elections resulted in a tie between the Democratic Nationalist Party and the Korea Nationalist Party, which both won 24 seats. Voter turnout was 91.9%.

Results

By city/province

See also
List of members of the National Assembly (South Korea), 1950–1954
Second National Assembly

References

Legislative elections in South Korea
South Korea
Legislative
Election and referendum articles with incomplete results